The 2013 AFC U-22 Championship Final was a football match that took place on 26 January 2014 at the Seeb Stadium in Seeb of Oman, to determine the winners of the 2013 AFC U-22 Championship. The match was contested by Iraq and Saudi Arabia, the winners of the semi-finals.

Iraq defeated the Saudis thanks to a 33rd minute goal from Mohannad Abdul-Raheem and took their first Asian title at U-22 level.

Route to the final

Match

References

See also 
2013 AFC U-22 Championship

AFC U-23 Championship finals

Saudi Arabia national football team matches

2020 AFC U-23 Championship
South Korea national football team matches
Football competitions in Thailand
Sport in Bangkok
January 2020 sports events in Asia